"Summer's Comin'" is a song co-written and recorded by American country music singer Clint Black.  It was released in March 1995 as the third single from his album One Emotion. The song reached the top of the Billboard Hot Country Singles & Tracks chart and the Canadian RPM Country Tracks chart.  It was written by Black and Hayden Nicholas.

Critical reception
Deborah Evans Price, of Billboard magazine reviewed the song unfavorably, questioning why Black would want to "waste his time composing refried Beach Boys music like this?" She concludes the review by saying that it sounds like Black "has been spending a little too much time in the sun."

Music video
The music video (directed entirely by Black himself) begins with a man (actor and TV personality Howie Mandel) skipping out from his job on a beautiful day and driving to a beach. There are many women there, but every woman he approaches turns out to be a man. His exploits on the beach are interwoven with shots of Black playing guitar and singing on that same beach. At the end of the video, a woman (Lisa Hartman Black, Clint Black's real-life wife) waves as she climbs off of a personal water craft and begins running towards Mandel. He opens his arms, assuming that she's running to him. But she shoves him aside and runs to Black instead, who turns to Mandel and says, "Don't even think about it." As Mandel appears heartbroken, actor Joey Lawrence (from the NBC TV series Blossom) pops up in front of the camera and utters his signature catchphrase, "Whoa!".

Other celebrities making a cameo appearance in the video include former Tonight Show host Jay Leno (as a sunbather laying in the sand), Leland Sklar (as Moses), David Hasselhoff (from the NBC TV series Knight Rider, as himself, speaking animatedly to a group of women before removing his sunglasses), George Kennedy (as a model in a photo shoot), country music host Charlie Chase (of the duo Crook & Chase, as a volleyball player), Gerald McRaney (of the CBS series Simon & Simon, as a customer at a snack stand), and Dick Clark (leaning on the rail of the pier).

Personnel
 Eddie Bayers — drums
 Clint Black — lead and backing vocals
 Dane Bryant — piano
 Dann Huff — electric guitar
 Jeff Peterson — pedal steel guitar
 Biff Watson — acoustic guitar
 Glenn Worf — bass guitar
 Curtis Young — backing vocals

Chart positions
"Summer's Comin'" debuted at number 51 on the U.S. Billboard Hot Country Singles & Tracks for the week of April 8, 1995.

Year-end charts

References

1995 singles
Clint Black songs
Songs written by Clint Black
Songs written by Hayden Nicholas
Song recordings produced by Clint Black
Song recordings produced by James Stroud
RCA Records Nashville singles
1994 songs